Moeller is a surname.

Moeller may also refer to:

Moeller High School, Cincinnati, Ohio, U.S.
Moeller method, a percussive stroke method